Oberea pallida is a species of flat-faced longhorn beetle in the tribe Saperdini in the genus Oberea, discovered by Casey in 1913.

References

P
Beetles described in 1913